Rajya Sabha elections were held in 1997, to elect members of the Rajya Sabha, Indian Parliament's upper chamber. 3 members from Kerala and 1 member from Puducherry    were elected.

Elections
Elections were held in 1997 to elect members from various states.
The list is incomplete.

Members elected
The following members are elected in the elections held in 1997. They are members for the term 1997-2003 and retire in year 2003, except in case of the resignation or death before the term.

State - Member - Party

Bye-elections
The following bye elections were held in the year 1997.

State - Member - Party

 Tamil Nadu - S Peter Alphonse- TMC (  ele  10/10/1997 term till 2002 )
 Tamil Nadu - M Abdul Kader- TMC (  ele  10/10/1997 term till 1998 )

References

1997 elections in India
1997